Courts of Rhode Island include:
;State courts of Rhode Island
Rhode Island Supreme Court
Rhode Island Superior Courts
Rhode Island District Courts
Rhode Island Family Courts
Rhode Island Workers' Compensation Courts
Rhode Island Traffic Tribunals

Federal courts located in Rhode Island
United States District Court for the District of Rhode Island

References

External links
National Center for State Courts – directory of state court websites.

Courts in the United States